Celeste Massiel Escobar Pérez (born 30 April 1993) is a Nicaraguan footballer who plays as a midfielder for the Nicaragua women's national team.

International career
Escobar capped for Nicaragua at senior level during two Central American and Caribbean Games editions (2014 and 2018) and the 2018 CONCACAF Women's Championship qualification.

References 

1993 births
Living people
Nicaraguan women's footballers
Women's association football midfielders
Nicaragua women's international footballers